The Nikon F camera, introduced in April 1959, was Nikon's first SLR camera.  It was one of the most advanced cameras of its day. Although many of the concepts had already been introduced elsewhere, it was revolutionary in that it was the first to combine them all in one camera.  It was produced until October 1973 and was replaced by the Nikon F2. Aspects of its design remain in all of Nikon's subsequent SLR cameras, through the current Nikon F6 film and Nikon D6 digital models (which still share its Nikon F-mount for lenses). The "F" in Nikon F was selected from the term "re-f-lex", since the pronunciation of the first letter "R" is not available in many Asian languages. That tradition was carried all the way through their top line of Nikon cameras until the introduction of the Nikon D1 (digital) cameras decades later.

Specially modified Nikon F cameras were used in space in the early 1970s aboard the Skylab space station.

History

The Nikon F was the first 35 mm SLR system to be widely adopted by professional photographers, especially photojournalists covering the Vietnam War, as well as for use by NASA astronauts.

It was originally priced at US$186 with 50mm f/2 lens; in November 1963 the US price was $233 for the body with a standard prism plus $90 for a 50mm f/2 lens or $155 for a 50mm f/1.4.

A combination of design elements made the Nikon F successful. It had interchangeable prisms and focusing screens; the camera had a depth-of-field preview button; the mirror had lock-up capability; it had a large bayonet mount and a large lens release button; a single-stroke ratcheted film advance lever; a titanium-foil focal plane shutter; various types of flash synchronization; a rapid rewind lever; a fully removable back. It was well-made, durable, and adhered closely to the successful design scheme of the Nikon rangefinder cameras. The camera was the first to use the F-mount bayonet lens mount system, which is still used as of 2022. Lead designer of the Nikon F was Yusaku Kamekura, the man behind the 1964 Summer Olympics logo.

The Nikon F evolved from a rangefinder camera, the Nikon SP. The prototype model, in particular, was an SP with a mirror box, pentaprism and larger lens mount grafted on.

The F was a modular system camera, with various assemblies such as viewfinders, focusing screens, and motor drives for 36-exposure and 250-exposure film cassettes. Third parties manufactured other film backs, such as two Speed Magny film backs—one using Polaroid 100 (later 600) type pack films, and another designed for 4x5 film accessories including Polaroid's own 4x5 instant film back. Each of these assemblies could be fitted and removed, allowing the camera to adapt to almost any task. The F36 motor drive, one of the first popular motor drives for SLR cameras, was capable of firing up to 4 frames per second with the mirror locked up or 3 frames per second with full reflex viewing maintained.

The Nikon F had a wide range of lenses, covering 21 mm to 1000 mm focal length by 1962. Nikon was among the first companies to manufacture Catadioptric system lens designs, combining mirrors and lenses to make more-compact lenses with longer focal lengths.

The Nikon F revolutionized the photographic market, stealing the thunder of German manufacturers Leica and Zeiss. The F had a reputation for being extremely resilient to damage or mechanical failure, becoming known as "the hockey puck."

In some markets, the camera was marketed as a "Nikkor F" due to trademark conflicts. In Germany, "Nikon" was seen as too similar to the Zeiss Ikon camera line. Nikkor F cameras have become collector's items.

The first Nikon F Photomic viewfinder, delivered since 1962, had an independent photocell. Then Nikon introduced the Photomic T (superseded by the Photomic Tn), which featured through-the-lens (TTL) metering. The final metering prism for the Nikon F, the Photomic FTn, introduced in 1968, provided 60% center-weighted TTL, which became the standard metering pattern for Nikon cameras for decades afterwards. Additional viewfinders included a waist-level viewer, a 6 power magnifying finder, and an "action finder" with a larger viewable area through which one could see the entire frame while wearing goggles and/or a helmet.

The Nikon F was succeeded in 1972 by the Nikon F2 series after a production total of 862,600 bodies. Subsequent "single-digit" F cameras continued as the top of Nikon's professional line of film SLRs, through the Nikon F6 introduced in 2004. Since the introduction of the digital Nikon D1 in 1999, Nikon has continued to reserve single-digit model numbers for top-of-the-line cameras.

Gallery

See also
 135 film
 Nikon SP
 History of the single-lens reflex camera
 Pentaprism
 System camera

References

Further reading
 Comon, P. (1996): Magic Lantern Guides Classic Series: Nikon Classic Cameras Vol. 1 for F, Nikkormat Series, Fe, Fe2nd Fa (Nikon Classic Cameras), Magic Lantern Guides
 Koch, U.: Nikon F, Coeln, Peter (England)
 Koch, U. (2003): Nikon F. The Camera, Lindemanns
 Koch, U. (2003): Nikon F. The Lenses, Lindemanns
 Koch, U. (2004): Nikon F. The Accessories, Lindemanns

External links

 The Legend: Nikon F  by luis triguez
 The Nikon F's Place in History
 The Nikon F and its System
 Nikon F Collection and Typology
 Debut of the Nikon F, by Nikon
 Comprehensive Nikon F website by Michael Liu
 Nikon F & F2 by Karen Nakamura
 A Nikon F Photomic TN Picture Gallery by Mårten Larsson
 Nikon F Photomic TN Flick pictures by Paul Bailey

F
F
Personal cameras and photography in space